The Hyphomicrobiales are an order of Gram-negative Alphaproteobacteria.

The rhizobia, which fix nitrogen and are symbiotic with plant roots, appear in several different families. The four families Nitrobacteraceae, Hyphomicrobiaceae, Phyllobacteriaceae, and Rhizobiaceae contain at least several genera of nitrogen-fixing, legume-nodulating, microsymbiotic bacteria. Examples are the genera Bradyrhizobium and Rhizobium. Species of the Methylocystaceae are methanotrophs; they use methanol (CH3OH) or methane (CH4) as their sole energy and carbon sources. Other important genera are the human pathogens Bartonella and Brucella, as well as Agrobacterium (useful in genetic engineering).

Taxonomy

Accepted families

 Aestuariivirgaceae Li et al. 2019
 Afifellaceae Hördt et al. 2020
 Ahrensiaceae Hördt et al. 2020
 Alsobacteraceae Sun et al. 2018
 Amorphaceae Hördt et al. 2020
 Ancalomicrobiaceae Dahal et al. 2018
 Aurantimonadaceae Hördt et al. 2020
 Bartonellaceae Gieszczykiewicz 1939 (Approved Lists 1980)
 Beijerinckiaceae Garrity et al. 2006
 Blastochloridaceae Hördt et al. 2020
 Boseaceae Hördt et al. 2020

 Breoghaniaceae Hördt et al. 2020
 Brucellaceae Breed et al. 1957 (Approved Lists 1980)
 Chelatococcaceae Dedysh et al. 2016
 Cohaesibacteraceae Hwang and Cho 2008
 Devosiaceae Hördt et al. 2020
 Hyphomicrobiaceae Babudieri 1950 (Approved Lists 1980)
 Kaistiaceae Hördt et al. 2020
 Lichenibacteriaceae Pankratov et al. 2020
 Lichenihabitantaceae Noh et al. 2019

 Methylobacteriaceae Garrity et al. 2006
 Methylocystaceae Bowman 2006
 Nitrobacteraceae corrig. Buchanan 1917 (Approved Lists 1980)

 Notoacmeibacteraceae Huang et al. 2017
 Parvibaculaceae Hördt et al. 2020
 Phreatobacteraceae Hördt et al. 2020
 Phyllobacteriaceae Mergaert and Swings 2006
 Pleomorphomonadaceae Hördt et al. 2020
 Pseudoxanthobacteraceae Hördt et al. 2020
 Rhabdaerophilaceae Ming et al. 2020
 Rhizobiaceae Conn 1938 (Approved Lists 1980)
 Rhodobiaceae Garrity et al. 2006
 Roseiarcaceae Kulichevskaya et al. 2014
 Salinarimonadaceae Cole et al. 2018
 Segnochrobactraceae Akter et al. 2020
 Stappiaceae Hördt et al. 2020
 Tepidamorphaceae Hördt et al. 2020
 Xanthobacteraceae Lee et al. 2005

Unassigned Genera
The following genus has not been assigned to a family:
 Flaviflagellibacter Dong et al. 2019

Provisional Taxa
These taxa have been published, but have not been validated according to the Bacteriological Code:
 "Nordella" La Scola et al. 2004
 "Propylenellaceae" Liu et al. 2021
 "Propylenella" Liu et al. 2021
 "Propylenella binzhouense" Liu et al. 2021
 "Thermopetrobacter" Sislak 2013

Phylogeny
The currently accepted taxonomy is based on the List of Prokaryotic names with Standing in Nomenclature and the phylogeny is based on whole-genome sequences.

Natural genetic transformation

Natural genetic transformation has been reported in at least four Hyphomicrobiales species: Agrobacterium tumefaciens, Methylobacterium organophilum, Ensifer adhaerens, and Bradyrhizobium japonicum.  Natural genetic transformation is a sexual process involving DNA transfer from one bacterial cell to another through the intervening medium, and the integration of the donor sequence into the recipient genome by homologous recombination.

See also 
 Lar1

Notes

References

Further reading 

 
 
 
 
 

 
Bacteria orders
Soil biology